Laxman Sivaramakrishnan (born 31 December 1965), popularly known as "Siva" and LS, is a former Indian cricketer and current cricket commentator. During his playing career, he was a right arm leg-spinner. Sivaramakrishnan began his commentary career in a test match between India and Bangladesh on 12 November 2000. He also serves as one of the players’ representatives on the International Cricket Council’s cricket committee.

Early days

Sivaramakrishnan first drew attention as a 12-year-old, claiming 7 wickets for 2 runs (7/2) in a Madras inter-school championship game. At fifteen, he was the youngest member of the Under-19 India squad that toured Sri Lanka under Ravi Shastri in 1980. He began his first class career at the age of 16, Sivaramakrishnan made an immediate impression. On his debut against Delhi cricket team in the quarter final of the 1981/82 Ranji Trophy, he took 7 for 28 in the second innings, all the wickets coming in a spell of eleven overs. On the weight of this performance, he was selected in the South Zone side to play the West Zone in the Duleep Trophy. After going wicketless in the first innings, he took five in the second, including the wicket of Sunil Gavaskar who padded up to a googly.

Sivaramakrishnan was immediately noticed and picked for the team to tour Pakistan in 1982/83 and later to the West Indies. He had played only three first class matches till then. Sivaramakrishnan made his Test debut at St. John's at the age of 17 years and 118 days. He was the youngest Indian Test cricketer till that point of time. He went wicketless but scored 17 runs in the only innings that he played. In 1984, he toured Zimbabwe with the Young India side under Ravi Shastri . Later that year, he bowled himself back to the Indian side taking of 4 for 27 against the visiting English cricket team for the India Under-25.

Rise to the top

Sivaramakrishnan's second Test appearance was in the first Test against England at Bombay. His first wicket was Graeme Fowler who was caught and bowled. His 6 for 64 and 6 for 117 helped India to an eight wicket win. It was India's first win in a Test match since 1981. Sivaramakrishnan took another six wickets in the next innings at Delhi. He took only five more wickets in the series.

In the World Championship of Cricket in Australia in the same season, he finished as the top wicket-taker and also took most catches in the Tournament. It was a time when spinners, especially leg-spinners, were considered a luxury in one day cricket. A memorable dismissal was of Javed Miandad who was stumped off a leg break in the final. Sivaramakrishnan did similarly well in the four nations tournament in Sharjah a few weeks later. India won 8 Consecutive matches along with Siva's ODI Debut. Overall India Won 12 out of the 16 matches Siva represented in his Career.

Decline and later career
His next season saw a sudden drop of form. He played a Test in Sri Lanka and two in Australia with little success. That was the end of his Test career.

He made an unexpected comeback to the 1987 World Cup team and played in two matches. The only wicket that he took was that of Zimbabwean John Traicos, caught at midwicket by Sunil Gavasskar

Sivaramakrishnan converted himself into a batsman and continued to play first class cricket on and off for another ten years. He contributed three centuries when Tamil Nadu won the Ranji trophy in 1987/88. There were frequent reports of a comeback to the national team, but they all proved to be rumours. In his last season he played for Baroda.

Name
With Hugh Bromley-Davenport and B. K. Venkatesh Prasad, he shares the record for the longest 'supposed' surname among Test cricketers. However, Sivaramakrishan is not his surname at all. He started out as L. Sivaramakrishnan but, as is typical with expanding initialled south Indian names, turning the L to Laxmanan caused Sivaramakrishnan to appear to be his surname. Sivaramakrishnan is his given name and his father's given name was Laxmanan and hence he started out as L. Sivaramakrishnan as is common with Tamils to keep the first letter of one's father's first name as initial.

Coaching career 
In December 2017, Chennai Super Kings named Laxman Sivaramakrishnan Spin Bowling coach for 2018 Indian Premier League.

ICC

In May 2013, Sivaramakrishnan was named as a players' representative on the International Cricket Council's cricket committee. In the ICC Champions Trophy 2017 he voiced his first commentary in the Tamil Language which was broadcast by Star Sports Tamil.

References

External links
 
 Article in The Cricket Monthly

1965 births
Living people
Indian cricket commentators
Cricketers at the 1987 Cricket World Cup
Indian cricketers
India One Day International cricketers
India Test cricketers
Tamil Nadu cricketers
South Zone cricketers
Baroda cricketers
Tamil sportspeople
Cricketers from Chennai